Lesbian, gay, bisexual, and transgender (LGBT) persons in  South Sudan face legal challenges not experienced by non-LGBT residents. Male same-sex sexual activity is illegal and carries a penalty of up to ten years' imprisonment,  LGBT persons are regularly prosecuted by the government and additionally face stigmatisation among the broader population.

Legality of same-sex sexual activity
South Sudan was formerly part of Sudan, and subject to its interpretation of Sharia law, under which homosexual activity was illegal, with punishments ranging from lashes to the death penalty. In 2008, the autonomous Government of Southern Sudan adopted its own penal code, which prohibits "carnal intercourse against the order of nature" and prescribes a sentence of ten years' imprisonment.

Recognition of same-sex unions
Same-sex couples have no legal recognition. Same-sex marriage is constitutionally banned, since the country adopted its Constitution in 2011.

Public attitudes
In July 2010, Salva Kiir Mayardit, now President of South Sudan, told Radio Netherlands Worldwide that homosexuality is not in the "character" of Southern Sudanese people. "It is not even something that anybody can talk about here in southern Sudan in particular. It is not there and if anybody wants to import or to export it to Sudan, it will not get the support and it will always be condemned by everybody," he said.

In 2006, Abraham Mayom Athiaan, a bishop in South Sudan, led a split from the Episcopal Church of Sudan for what he regarded as a failure by the church leadership to condemn homosexuality sufficiently strongly.

The U.S. Department of State's 2011 Human Rights Report found "widespread" societal discrimination against gay men and lesbians, and stated that there were no known LGBT organisations.

Summary table

See also

 Human rights in South Sudan
 LGBT rights in Sudan

References

LGBT in South Sudan
South Sudan
LGBT rights
Human rights in South Sudan